Lithocarpus blumeanus is a tree in the beech family Fagaceae. It is named for the German-Dutch botanist Carl Ludwig Blume.

Description
The greyish brown bark is scaly.

Distribution and habitat
Lithocarpus blumeanus grows naturally in Thailand, Borneo and Peninsular Malaysia. Its habitat is dipterocarp to lower montane forests up to  altitude.

References

blumeanus
Trees of Thailand
Trees of Borneo
Trees of Peninsular Malaysia
Plants described in 1844